Zdeněk Sobotka (17 January 1917 – 20 January 2001) was a Czech athlete. He competed in the men's high jump at the 1936 Summer Olympics.

References

External links
 

1917 births
2001 deaths
Athletes (track and field) at the 1936 Summer Olympics
Czech male high jumpers
Olympic athletes of Czechoslovakia
People from Benátky nad Jizerou
Sportspeople from the Central Bohemian Region